Pierre de Vallombreuse (born 1962 in Bayonne), made a photographic collection of 41 indigenous peoples over 25 years of travel to all continents, with more than 130,000 photographs, paying tribute to their diversity.

Biography
In contact with Joseph Kessel, a French author and traveler, de Vallombreuse felt a very early desire to be a witness of his time. In 1984, he entered the École Nationale Supérieure des Arts Décoratifs in Paris with the idea of becoming a cartoonist. A trip to Borneo the next year, though, changed the course of his life. He shared his daily life with the Punans, the last nomads of the jungle. Normally a sedentary artist, de Vallombreuse decided to become a nomadic witness, and photography became his mode of expression. While still a student at the Arts Décoratifs in Paris, he took multiple trips to the Philippine jungle to stay with the Palawan people. In total, he lived with them for over two years. The first part of his work on this tribe was presented at the photographic festival Les Rencontres internationales de la photographie in Arles.

De Vallombreuse was Secretary General of the Association of Anthropology and Photography (association Anthropologie et Photographie, Paris Diderot University). Since then, he has regularly collaborated with leading international magazines: GEO (France, Russia, Germany, Spain, South Korea, Japan), Sciences et Avenir, Le Monde 2, Le Figaro Magazine, Newsweek, El Mundo, El País, and La Stampa.

The Origins of Man (Hommes Racines)
Encompassing five years of work, this project represents the commitment of a photographer with eleven indigenous peoples spread across the globe. Its main purpose is to show the intimate relationship between man and his environment. De Vallombreuse presented his work as a testament to the diversity of lifestyles, practices, and traditional knowledge that are embedded in very different environments. These cultures are repositories of knowledge essential to the preservation of biodiversity. De Vallombreuse aimed to promote a reflection on humanity sustainable whose corollary is the protection of nature.

Whenever linked to a specific people, the project emphasizes the multiplicity of responses to living conditions imposed by nature and history. It is in this context that de Vallombreuse addresses this root concept. By meeting people entrenched in their territory and those who have been subjected to the test of uprooting, de Vallombreuse analyzed changes in life affecting our modernity. He worked to show how indigenous peoples are often the first victims of environmental disasters: food shortages, deforestation, global warming, pollution, and water war, crucial questions that, far from being local concerns, affect our mutual humanity.

Since 2007, this project has resulted in 12 exhibitions and numerous publications.

Prizes 
 Winner of Leonardo da Vinci, Ministry of Foreign Affairs, 1993 
 The Hard Life of Tulibac, a film on Palawan product for Canal and the BBC, received numerous awards 
 First prize for "Golden Island", International Film Festival Adventure, Bailly, 2000 
 First Prize, International Mountain and Adventure Film Festival, Graz, Austria, 2001 
 Camera Alpin in Gold International Film Festival Island, Groix, 2002

Publications

 Taw Batu : Hommes des rochers, text by Charles Macdonald, Boulogne, Ed. Albert Kahn Museum, 1994
 Les Hommes des rochers, Paris, Hoebeke, 2002 
 Peuples, Texts and Edgar Morin Emmanuel Garrigues, Paris, Flammarion, 2006 
 Itinéraires, Paris, Ed. La Martinière, 2008 
 La Dalle : Voyages à Choisy-le-Roi, Paris, Editions de la Martinière, 2010 
 Hommes racines, Paris, Ed. La Martinière, 2012 
 Y a-t-il la lune chez toi? Ed. Le Passeur, 2014

External links
de Vallombreuse's website

1962 births
Living people
French photographers